Grzegorz Jerzy Turnau (born 31 July 1967) is a Polish composer, pianist, poet and singer. He has released eleven albums to date, including one (Cafe Sułtan) made up of his own versions of songs by Jeremi Przybora and Jerzy Wasowski, and most have enjoyed considerable chart success.

His characteristic style consists of strong, clear lyrics and music composed in special keys and harmonies, using instruments such as the piano (played by himself), saxophone, violin and various horns. Influenced by such artists as Marek Grechuta and Jan Kanty Pawluśkiewicz, his music style falls within the broad genre of sung poetry.

Biography 
He was born on 31 July 1967 in Kraków, Poland. At age seventeen he won First Prize (Grand Prix) at The Student Song Festival in Kraków in 1984. He went on to join the Piwnica pod Baranami Cabaret, composing such hits as "Znów wędrujemy", and released his first album, Naprawdę nie dzieje się nic ("Really, nothing is happening") in 1991.

He did participate in the Aleksander Glondys's "Ellington po krakowsku" ("Ellington Kraków Way"), a concert based upon idea of notable composers of Piwnica pod Baranami playing their interpretations of Duke's music. Other participants include Pawluśkiewicz, Zbigniew Raj and several other musicians.

Discography

Solo albums

Compilation albums

Cover albums

Collaborative albums

Live albums

References

External links

 Official internet page of Grzegorz Turnau

1967 births
Living people
Musicians from Kraków
Polish composers
Sung poetry of Poland
Mystic Production artists
Recipients of the Silver Medal for Merit to Culture – Gloria Artis
Recipients of the Gold Cross of Merit (Poland)
20th-century Polish male singers
21st-century Polish male singers
21st-century Polish singers
People educated at Bedford School